Nyi Nyi Min (born 1 October 1994) is a footballer from Burma, and a midfielder for Myanmar national football team and  Myanmar U-22 football team.
He currently plays for  Chin United in Myanmar National League.

References

Living people
Burmese footballers
Myanmar international footballers
1994 births

Association football midfielders